Elmer Joseph Angsman Jr. (December 11, 1925 – April 11, 2002) was an American football halfback in the National Football League (NFL).

Early life and career 
Angsman was born on the south side of Chicago in 1925, the son of Elmer and Helen Angsman. Elmer attended Mount Carmel High School and also starred for Notre Dame in college from 1943 to 1945 (playing on the 1943 National Championship team 1943 college football season and the College All-Star team that defeated the world champion Cleveland Rams), played seven seasons in the NFL, all with the Chicago Cardinals. After graduating from Notre Dame in three years with a degree in journalism, Angsman was the youngest player ever drafted to play in the NFL at the age of 20 with the 16th overall pick of the 1946 draft.

NFL career 
Angsman was part of Charles Bidwill’s "Dream Backfield". Although Bidwill did not live to see it, the talented corps that included Charley Trippi, Paul Christman, Pat Harder, and Angsman went on to achieve great success. In the 1947 NFL championship game against the Philadelphia Eagles, Angsman scored twice on runs of 70 yards each. The final touchdown, a run up the middle like the first against Eagle coach Greasy Neale's famed 5-2-4 defense, put the game out of reach. Angsman finished the game with 10 carries for 159 yards. His 15.9 yard per carry average is still an NFL post-season record (10 carries or more). The 1947 title was the Cardinal franchise's last championship. Don Paul, a former defensive back for the Cardinals and later the Cleveland Browns, once said, "he was...a straight ahead north and south runner who would just as soon leave cleat marks on your balls as run around you."

Angsman and the Cardinals never reclaimed the glory of the 1947 championship season. In 1948, Angsman led the Cardinals in rushing, with 412 yards and 7 touchdowns, and the Cards edged the Chicago Bears for the West Conference title. They met the Eagles once again in the 1948 NFL Championship Game title game now referred to as "The Blizzard Bowl". The field was covered by snow and the entire game was played in a storm. The Cardinals running attack was greatly hampered and the Eagles star Steve Van Buren was the only player who could run effectively in the conditions. Angsman mustered only 33 yards on 10 carries. Only 5 passes were completed by both teams combined. Van Buren's 5 yard touchdown run in the fourth quarter was the only scoring as the Eagles won their first championship, 7–0.

The Cardinals' visionary coach, Jimmy Conzelman, quit after the 1948 season and the Cardinals drifted into mediocrity. Angsman had his best season in 1949 with 674 yards rushing on 125 carries and 6 touchdowns. He, Pat Harder, and Charlie Trippi shared running duties and combined for 1,674 yards and 16 touchdowns that year (in comparison, Steve Van Buren set the NFL single season rushing record in 1949 with 1146 yards). However, the future of NFL success lay in dynamic passing attacks such as that possessed by the Los Angeles Rams and Cleveland Browns. Angsman's production fell off significantly in 1950 and 1951, with 363 and 380 yards, respectively, and an average under 3.5 yards per carry. By 1952, with stunning rookie halfback Ollie Matson joining the club, Angsman was relegated to a seldom-used backup role. He retired after the 1952 season at age 27. He finished with career statistics of 683 carries, 2908 yards (4.3 avg), and 27 touchdowns. He caught 41 passes for 654 yards and 5 touchdowns.  Angsman was selected to the first ever Pro Bowl 1951 Pro Bowl in 1950.

Commentating and later life 
After his NFL career, Angsman was a color commentator beginning in 1958 with CBS Radio, later ABC and finishing with NBC in 1972. Angsman called college and pro games, most notably the 1968 Sugar Bowl and several Orange Bowl games. He is a member of the Chicagoland Sports Hall of Fame. Angsman owned various companies after commentating finding success in paper manufacturing and eventually retiring to Juno Beach, Florida. In April 2002, Elmer Angsman died of a heart attack while playing golf.

External links
"The Dream Backfield"
Chicago Tribune Article
New York Times obituary
"NFL Stats"
Chicago Tribune

1925 births
2002 deaths
American Football League announcers
American football running backs
Chicago Cardinals players
College football announcers
Eastern Conference Pro Bowl players
Notre Dame Fighting Irish football players
Players of American football from Chicago
People from Juno Beach, Florida